Camille Jean Verdelaire D. Dela Rosa (born 29 July 1982) is a painter who studied at the University of the Philippines, Diliman. Her works, commencing in 1998, include Impressionist gardens, landscapes, churches, beaches, and morbid surrealisms.

Formative years

She was born on 29 July 1982 in Santa Cruz Manila, Philippines. Both of her parents were professors and artists. Her father is the late noted painter Ibarra Dela Rosa. He was an art educator, a poet and a philosopher. As a painter, he was prolific. He had a total of 80 solo exhibitions both in the Philippines and abroad.  Dela Rosa's father did not teach her how to paint, so, after his death in 1998, she taught herself how to paint and pursued her own artistic vision, using her father's style and previous paintings as an inspiration. In that same year, she then mounted her first solo exhibition at the age of 16.

In the year 2000, she began to depart from her father's style and started to give way to her penchant for impressionist techniques as seen in her 2000 to 2008 paintings. Camille produced spontaneously and exhibited her gardens, churches, landscapes, flowers, portraits, nudes, and people in their various endeavors along this grain.
Dela Rosa was inspired by Rico Manlapas, the curator of Artis Corpus gallery, to explore her range of style. When she found what she was looking for, Camille surprised the art scene by launching her 16th solo exhibit, titled "Aenigma." The show was a complete departure from her usual impressionistic garden paintings. For a year, she explored the surreal, the morbid, the mechanical, and the unknown. Her works were dominated with proto-human skulls and skeletons - in anatomical veracity of detail. Evident also were symbolic images and leading motifs such as nude female figures, fetuses, throbbing hearts, ghoulish faces and realistic, probosces, mouths and eyeballs, human skeletons and nude female figures.

So from the year 2009 up to the present, her works, classified as surrealism, are images from her subconscious mind. Through this, she was able to create artworks that to others are "morbid" but oozing with mystical, esoteric and occult symbolism.

Solo exhibitions

2012

•	19th- "DOMINION" October 11 to November 4, Artinformal, Connecticut Street,  Greenhills East, Mandaluyong, Philippines

2012

•	18th- "METAMORPHOSIS" June 19 to 29, Spark Museum, De La Salle Santiago  Zobel School, Ayala Alabang Village, Muntinlupa.

2010

•	17th- "AENIGMA Unveiled" March 18 to May 16, The Picasso Art Gallery and  ArtisCorpus Gallery, Salcedo Village, Makati

2009

•	16th Exhibit- "AENIGMA" December 5 to 28, Artis Corpus Gallery, Haig, Mandaluyong

2008

•	15th Exhibit- "Moods and Moments" Aug. 22 to 31, Renaissance Art Gallery, bldg. A, Level 4, SM Megamall, Mandaluyong

•	14th Exhibit- "Colours of Serenity" MAy 9 to 31, 1/of Gallery, 2 ng level, Shops at Serendra(across Market MArket), Bonifacio Global City, Taguig

2006

•	13th Exhibit- "Sacred Heritage" Churches of Luzon, October 5 to 19- Ayala Museum (MuseumSpace) 2nd Floor, Glass Wing, Ayala hakdok Museum, Makati.

•	12th Exhibit- "Diversity" 116 Art Works, July 26 to August 17, 2006- Le Souffle, The Fort Global City Fort Bonifacio, Taguig Metro Manila

2004

•	11th Exhibit- "Evolved Works"- Dec. 8, 2004 to Jan. 17, 2005- Nicotina Garden Pavillon, Roxas Blvd.

•	10th Exhibit- "Variations" (In cooperation with Zonta Club of Makati) - Greenhills West, 22 Xavier St. San Juan, Metro Manila 9th

•	9th Exhibit- "Old Soul" (Revisiting Intramuros) July 17 to 27 - Gallery Nine, Level 4, SM Megamall, Mandaluyong

2003

•	8th Exhibit- "Glorious Gardens" Gallery 828 Shangrila-Mall, Edsa. Mandaluyong Philippines.

•	7th Exhibit- "Gardens in Rhapsody" Art Conservatory, Makati, Philippines.

2002

•	6th Exhibit- "Natures Symphony". Gardens of Gretchen O. Cojuangco, Philippines.

2001

•	5th Exhibit- "Prelude". Gallery 828 and Artistree. Shangrila Edsa Mandaluyong Philippines.

2000

•	4th Exhibit- "Moods... Camille Unfolding" Ayala Museum Artlane, Makati Philippines.

1999

•	3rd Exhibit- "Floral Inspirations". Heritage Art Venue, Shangrila Edsa Mandaluyong Philippines.

•	2nd Exhibit- "Flores de Mayo" Heritage Art Gallery S.M. Megamall Artwalk, Mandaluyong Philippines.

1998

•       1st Exhibit- "The Legacy" Ad-Infinitum Gallery San Juan Philippines.

Group exhibitions

2013

• "Regurgitating Daisies"- Galerie Anna, SM Megamall, Mandaluyong August 15 to 29

• "Mist in the Realm of the Subconscious Mind" Two-Woman Exhibit of Camille Dela Rosa and Lydia Velasco - Galerie Artes is at Nueve Uno Bldg., Xavierville Ave., Loyola Heights, Quezon City.

• "Beyond Comparison"- Vinyl on Vinyl Gallery, The Collective, Malugay St. Makati - June 15

• "Bilog"- 2nd Level, Fort Pointe Bldg., Bonifacio Global City, Taguig- May 21to 31

• "Beginnings"- Kaida ContemporaryGallery, 45 Scout Madrinan St., South Triangle, Quezon City - March 31 to April 20

• "Aman"- Art Center (Gallery Nine), SM Megamall - March 8 to 24

• "Year 11"- Galerie Joaquin's 11th anniversary at Podium (the Atrium), Ortigas, Mandaluyong. City- Feb. 4 to 7

2012

• "Klaro" Altro Mondo-Arte Contemporanea, third floor, Greenbelt 5, Ayala Center, Makati- June 7 to 30, 2012

• "Kristo" Art Center, SM Megamall - March 23 - April 8, 2012

2011

• "Tolerated Misbehaviors" Galerie Anna, SM Megamall - February 3 to 17, 2011

2010

• "RE:VIEW"- Gallery Indigo of BenCab Museum, Baguio City- Nov. 20, 2010 to January 11, 2011

• " Manila Art Fair" - (represented by ArtisCorpus Gallery) July 29 to Aug. 1, SMX Convention Center

• " Picasso-Art Cabinet Initiated Art Events"- March 18, Picasso Art Gallery and ArtisCopus Gallery, Salcedo Village, Makati

• " Womb Vox"- March 14, Kaida Gallery, Q.C.

• " Art in the Park"- (represented by ArtisCorpus Gallery and Tala Gallery) February 27, Jaime Velasquez Park, Salcedo Village Makati

2009

• " Philippine Art Awards regional winners- National Museum

• " PAST, FUTURE, PERFECT- Tala Gallery, Tomas Morato, Q.C.

• " MANILA ART FAIR- July 16 to 19, The Fort, NBC Tent, Global City, Taguig

• " SUBTLE INDISCRETION- August 22 to September 14, ArtisCorpus Gallery, San Juan Mla.

• " GSIS PAINTING COMPETITION- June 4 to July 1, GSIS Museum, Pasay

• " PAGALINGAN PINAY- May 29 to 31, LRI Design Plaza, Makaty City

• " WALONG FILIPINA- March 21 to April 4, Liongoren Gallery, Cubao Q.C. and April 5 to 6, at the Sining Kamalig, Gateway Mall, Araneta Center, Q.C

• " BATANG SINING- March 15 to April 21, ArtisCorpus Gallery, San Juan Mla.

• " NEW BEGINNINGS- January 28, Verdana Gallery, Corinthian Garden, Edsa

2008

• "Varied Palettes"- Art Center, Level 4, Edsa Megamall, Edsa Mandaluyong

• "Figura- Art Asia Gallery, The Artwalk, Level 4, SM Megamall, Edsa Mandaluyong.

• "Homage to Malang"- 40th Anniversary Show of the Saturday Group of Artist at the Art Center, 
Level 4 SM Megamall, Edsa Mandaluyong

2007

• LES 111 DES ARTS PARIS- Toulouse, France: November 29 to December 9 at Chapelle de l'Hotel Dieu 2, rue Viguerie - 31300 Toulouse

• EUROPE ART EXHIBIT TOUR "Drift to the World of MAsters" A Jpurney of Filipino Artists:

 June 18 to 20 at Ernst and Young Gallery, Luxemburg
 June 14 to 23 at Le Meridien Hotel, Brussels, Belgium
 June 12 to 23 at Jan Van Der Togt Museum, Amstelveen, the Netherlands
 June 11 to 17 at Hotel Intercon, Berlin Germany
 May 30 to June 4 at The Gallery at Chelsea Library, Kingsroad, London U.K.

• "Journey" A prelude to a series of Exhibitions in Europe at 1/of Gallery, Serendra, Bonifacio Global City Taguig

• Painting Exhibit on The Occasion of International Women's Month"(a project by The Zonta Club of Makati, Environs & Foundations Inc.) ArtSpace and Gallery Philippines, Glorietta, Makati

• "Kutkot..Cut Above the rest"(Philippine Association of Print Makers) Power Plant Mall, Rockwell, Makati

• "Into Thy Hands" The Kristo-Manila Exhibit at 1/of Gallery, Serendra, Bonifacio Global City, Taguig

2006

• Contemporary Impressionists of the Philippines, Vargas Museum, University of the Philippines, Diliman, Quezon City

• Flores de Mayo, Vargas Museum, University of the Philippines, Diliman, Quezon City

• Behold, A Lenten Exhibit- April 4 to April 16 at Gallery Nine, Level 4, SM Megamall, Mandaluyong

2005

• The Colors of the Philippines, June 5 to 12 at Hilton Petaling Jaya Hotel, 46200

• Petaling Jaya Selangor Darul Ehsan, Malaysia

• 100 Years: 100 Women Artist, March 2005, Cultural Center of the Philippines

• Images of Tranquility at The Heritage Park, Fort Bonifacio, Global City, Taguig

• Sabathchani, Gallery Nine, Level 4, SM Megamall, Edsa, Mandaluyong

• Harvest, Gallery Joaquin, San Juan Metro Manila

• Mag-Ina, Rockwell Power Plant, Makati

2004

• Senaskwela II, Crucible Gallery, Level 4, SM Megamall, Edsa, Mandaluyong

2003

• Senaskwela, Art Center, Level 4, SM Megamall, Edsa, Mandaluyong

2000

• Music & Paintings, Republic of Malate, Manila Philippines Boundless, Artistress Shangrila Hotel, Mandaluyong Philippines

• Book Launching, Encyclopedia of Philippine Paintings and Sculptures. Le Souffle' The Fort, Global City, Taguig Philippines.

• Alay sa Mindanao, Manila Peninsula Hotel Makati Philippines.

• Blumentritt Group of Artists, Ad-Infinitum Gallery San Juan, Philippines.

• Alaala ni Louie Beltran, BSK Artists Group Exhibit, GSIS Museum, manila Philippines.

• Vision 2000, Universal Motors Corp. Makati, Philippines.

• Alay sa Kalikasan. Ad-Infinitum Gallery San Juan, Philippines.

• Scenes from a Caf'e. Gene's Bistro, Quezon City Philippines.

1999

• Pagtatagpo ng HIlaga at Timog Philippines.

• Iba't-Iba Pero Iisa, Y Gallery, Quezon City, Philippines.

• Sangbalikat, P.N.B. Pasay, Philippines.

• Blumentritt Group Exhibit, Tagaytay Highlands Philippines.

• Blumentritt Group Exhibit, Ad-Infinitum Gallery San Juan Philippines.

1998

• Ambivalent Feelings, Hotel Sofitel Manila, Philippines.

Awards and citations received
"Top 40" Philippine Art Awards 2009
"Second Prize" Pagalingan Pinay Art Competition 2009
"Honorable Mention" Art Association of the Philippines 58th Annual Competition 2005
Awarded by the Filipino Worker's Resource Center (Philippine Embassy) for Invaluable Support & Cooperation to the Center of Filipino workers in Malaysia.
Awarded for Artistic Excellence and Aesthetic Contribution to Zonta Club of Makati
Commissioned by former Philippine Tourism Authority Gen. Manager Lito Banayo to interpret the Luneta Boardwalk in oil painting; photo of the aforesaid art work was used as CD cover for the musical theater Miss Saigon in Manila staged at CCP year 2000
Guest of honor and speaker during ABS-CBN Learning Center's Commencement Exercise of Batch 2000
Awarded the highest honor as high school graduate of ABS-CBN Learning Center, year 1999
Semi-Finalist, 2nd Metro Pop Star Search, sponsored by GMA Network - 1996
Grand Prize Winner at Tabernacle of Faith Christian Academy’s on-the spot art contest, 1995
Most Promising Student in Piano at Ms. Marita Gonzales Music Studio, Mandaluyong, 1995
First Prize at Philippine Chung Hua High School, Art Contest, Elementary category, 1994

References
• http://www.camilledelarosa.net/

• https://web.archive.org/web/20140318121815/http://www.jinksonscyberniche.com/62/category/exhibits/5.html

• http://www.artslant.com/global/artists/show/85238-camille-dela-rosa?tab=EXHIBITS

• http://www.vagallery.com/camille-dela-rosa.html

• http://surrealistisch.blogspot.com/2012/07/camille-de-la-rosa.html

1982 births
Living people
People from Santa Cruz, Manila
Artists from Metro Manila
Star Magic
Filipino women artists
University of the Philippines Diliman alumni